Mytilus may refer to:

 Mytilus of Illyria, an ancient Illyrian king
 Mytilus (bivalve), a mollusc genus